The Order of Military Merit José María Córdova is an order granted by Colombia. Established by Decree 3950 of 28 December 1950, the order is awarded to members of the Army of Colombia who have excelled in discipline and military virtue, provided eminent services and fellowship, or for acts of courage.

Grades
The Order of Military Merit José María Córdova is awarded in the following grades:
 Grand Cross (Gran Cruz)
 Grand Officer (Gran Oficial)
 Commander (Comendador)
 Officer (Oficial)
 Knight (Caballero)
 Companion (Compañero)

References

External links
CAPÍTULO IV. CONDECORACIONES POR VIRTUDES MILITARES Y PROFESIONALES DE CARÁCTER EXCEPCIONAL DE LAS ÓRDENES Y SU CONSEJO.

Orders, decorations, and medals of Colombia